Bia National Park is a national park in the Bia district in the Western Region of Ghana. It is also a biosphere reserve with a 563 square kilometer resource reserve. It has some of Ghana's last remnants of relatively untouched forest complete with its full diversity of wildlife. Some of the tallest trees left in West Africa are found in this national park. It constitutes a twin conservation area called the Bia National Park and the Bia Resource Reserve.

Geography
Bia National Park is located near the Ivorian border, the Bia River, and its tributaries flow into the Ivorian drainage area. It is found in the transitional zone between moist-evergreen and moist semi-deciduous forest types. Access to the park from Kumasi is through Bibiani, Sefwi Wiawso to Sefwi Asempanaye or Goaso through Sankore to Sefwi Asempanaye. From Sunyani, it can be reached through Berekum, Wanfi, Adabokrom and Debiso. From Côte d'Ivoire the park can be reached through Osei Kojokrom and Debiso.

History
Bia was created in 1935 and named after the Bia River which drains the area. It became an official national park in 1974.  Intensive farming destroyed much of the original vegetation in the park.  However, since 1975, no human activities like farming or logging have taken place.  In 1985 the park was named a biosphere reserve and a UNESCO world heritage site.

Wildlife
There are about 62 species of mammals (including 10 primate species which are the Black-and-White colobus, the olive colobus, red colobus monkeys and chimpanzees) known to live in the park, and over 189 bird species, including the endangered white-breasted guinea fowl, Black-collared lovebird, Cassin’s hawk Eagle, Honeyguide greenbul, Black-headed oriole, Brown and Puvel’s illadopsis, Finch’s Flycatcher-Thrush, Grey-headed Negrofinch, Western nicator, Spotted greenbul, Grey-headed bristlebill, Fire-bellied woodpecker and Melancholy woodpecker). The park is also the only known home of the newly discovered species of lizard, Agama africana. Ghana's major protected forest antelope communities also live in the park. The forest elephant and the bongo which is claimed to be highly threatened can be found there.

Activities 
Walking trails and roads lead to the reserve of the forest, where wild animals and birds can be spotted. Ecological studies and snail picking are also undertaken in the reserve.

A cultural site called Apaso, is located in the park closer to two small pools and claimed to be a sacred place for visitors to sacrifice and give gifts to the gods.

Bibliography

Notes

References

 - Total pages: 395 
 - Total pages: 171 

National parks of Ghana
Eastern Guinean forests